Folsom Borough School District is a community public school district that serves students in pre-kindergarten through eighth grade from Folsom, in Atlantic County, New Jersey, United States.

The district participates in the Interdistrict Public School Choice Program at Folsom Elementary School, having been approved on November 2, 1999, as one of the first 10 districts statewide to participate in the program. Seats in the program for non-resident students are specified by the district and are allocated by lottery, with tuition paid for participating students by the New Jersey Department of Education.

As of the 2018–19 school year, the district, comprised of one school, had an enrollment of 410 students and 39.0 classroom teachers (on an FTE basis), for a student–teacher ratio of 10.5:1.

The district is classified by the New Jersey Department of Education as being in District Factor Group "CD", the sixth-highest of eight groupings. District Factor Groups organize districts statewide to allow comparison by common socioeconomic characteristics of the local districts. From lowest socioeconomic status to highest, the categories are A, B, CD, DE, FG, GH, I and J.

For ninth through twelfth grades, public school students attend Hammonton High School, in Hammonton as part of a sending/receiving relationship with the Hammonton Public Schools, alongside students from Waterford Township, who attend for grades 7-12 as part of an agreement with the Waterford Township School District. As of the 2018–19 school year, the high school had an enrollment of 1,393 students and 97.4 classroom teachers (on an FTE basis), for a student–teacher ratio of 14.3:1.

School
Folsom School served 402 students in grades PreK - 8 as of the 2018–19 school year.

Administration
Core members of the district's administration are:
Dr. Matthew Mazzoni, Superintendent / Principal
Christopher Veneziani, Business Administrator / Board Secretary

Board of education
The district's board of education, comprised of seven members, sets policy and oversees the fiscal and educational operation of the district through its administration. As a Type II school district, the board's trustees are elected directly by voters to serve three-year terms of office on a staggered basis, with either two or three seats up for election each year held (since 2012) as part of the November general election. The board appoints a superintendent to oversee the day-to-day operation of the district.

References

External links
Folsom School website

School Data for the Folsom School, National Center for Education Statistics
Hammonton High School

Folsom, New Jersey
New Jersey District Factor Group CD
School districts in Atlantic County, New Jersey
Public K–8 schools in New Jersey